Rodgerson is a surname. Notable people with the surname include:

Eva Rodgerson (born 1945), Canadian politician
Ian Rodgerson (born 1966), English footballer
Ralph Rodgerson (1893–?), English footballer
Stan Rodgerson (1894–1955), Australian rules footballer

See also
Rogerson